Disembowelment is a compilation of all the recorded material by the Australian death-doom band Disembowelment. It was released on 28 June 2005 by Relapse Records as a two-CD set in a gatefold package with the band's logo embossed on the cover. Included with the album was a booklet featuring an extensive biography of the band written by drummer Paul Mazziotta. A limited edition of the album contained a third CD comprising four tracks, one of which is a cover of the Necrovore song "Slaughtered Remains". It was also issued as a triple LP by 3XM Productions in a limited edition of 500. Disc One of this collection is the band's 1993 album Transcendence Into The Peripheral in its entirety. Disc Two is composed of the 1992 EP Dusk (tracks 1 - 3), an early version of the song "Excoriated" titled "Extracted Nails" that featured only on a compilation album called Pantalgia from 1991 and the remainder is the complete 1990 demo "Mourning September".

Track listing

Disc 1
"The Tree of Life and Death"
"Your Prophetic Throne of Ivory"
"Excoriate"
"Nightside of Eden"
"A Burial at Ornans"
"The Spirits of the Tall Hills"
"Cerulean Transience of All My Imagined Shores"

Disc 2
 "The Tree of Life and Death"
 "A Burial at Ornans"
 "Cerulean Transience of All My Imagined Shores"
 "Extracted Nails"
 "Intro - Mourning September"
 "Impoverished Filth"
 "Extracted Nails"
 "Thou Messiah"
 "Outro"

Disc 3
 "The Spirits of the Tall Hills "
 "Slaughtered Remains"
 "The Spirits of the Tall Hills"
 "Your Prophetic Throne of Ivory"

 Track one of this disc is an unreleased version; track 2 is a Necrovore cover; track 3 and 4 are from a rehearsal recording. Note that this third disc was only available in a special limited edition and is not available on most versions of this release.

Credits

 Renato Gallina - vocals, guitar
 Paul Mazziotta - drums
 Matthew Skarajew - bass
 Jason Kells - guitar
 Tony Mazziotta - double bass, track 7, disc 1
 I'da - vocals, track 4, disc 1
 Tim Aldridge - bass, track 4, disc 2
 Dean Ruprich - bass, tracks 5 - 9, disc 2

2005 compilation albums
Disembowelment (band) albums